Battle of Polotsk may refer to the following battles which took place during the Napoleon's invasion of Russia:
 First battle of Polotsk, 17–18 August 1812
 Second battle of Polotsk, 17–19 October 1812

See also
Siege of Polotsk (disambiguation)